This is a list of members of the Victorian Legislative Council between 1955 and 1958. As half of the Legislative Council's terms expired at each triennial election, half of these members were elected at the 1952 triennial election with terms expiring in 1958, while the other half were elected at the 1955 triennial election with terms expiring in 1961.

 On 15 January 1956, Herbert Ludbrook, Liberal MLC for Ballarat Province, died. Liberal candidate Pat Dickie won the resulting by-election on 3 March 1956.
 On 17 May 1957, William MacAulay, Country MLC for Gippsland Province, died. Country candidate Bob May won the resulting by-election on 29 June 1957.

Sources
 Re-member (a database of all Victorian MPs since 1851). Parliament of Victoria.

Members of the Parliament of Victoria by term
20th-century Australian politicians